Richard J. Temkin (born 8 January 1945) is a plasma physicist and researcher on plasma-heating gyrotrons and other electromagnetic devices involving high-powered microwaves or terahertz radiation.

Education and career
Temkin received a bachelor's degree from Harvard University in 1966 and a Ph.D.from MIT in 1971, supervised by Benjamin Lax and Paul M. Raccah with thesis Experimental charge density of copper.

Dr. Temkin has served as a Senior Research Scientist in the MIT Physics Department since 1985, and as the Associate Director of the MIT Plasma Science and Fusion Center (PSFC) since 1998. He is also the Division Head for the PSFC's Waves and Beams Division. Awards received include the IEEE Plasma Science and Applications Award (2013); Exceptional Service Award of the International Society of Infrared, Millimeter, and Terahertz Waves (2011); the Robert L. Woods Award of the U. S. Department of Defense for Vacuum Electronics, the Certificate of Recognition from the IEEE Electron Device Society, and the Kenneth J. Button Prize and Medal from the Institute of Physics. He is a Fellow of the American Physical Society, IEEE, and the Institute of Physics.

Selected publications
with Bruce Gordon Danly: 
with Lino R. Becerra, Gary J. Gerfen, David J. Singel, & Robert G. Griffin: 
with Kevin L. Felch, Bruce Danly, Hopward R. Jory, Kenneth E. Kreischer, Wes Lawson, & Baruch Levush: 
with Melanie Rosay, Jonathan C. Lansing, Kristin C. Haddad, William W. Bachovchin, Judith Herzfeld, R. G. Griffin: 
with Thorsten Maly, Galia T. Debelouchina, Vikram S. Bajaj, Kan-Nian Hu, Chan-Gyu Joo, Melody L. Mak–Jurkauskas, Jagadishwar R. Sirigiri, P. C. van der Wel, J. Herzfeld, & R. G. Griffin: 
with John H. Booske, Richard J. Dobbs, Colin D. Joye, Carol L. Kory, George R. Neil, Gun-Sik Park, & Jaehun Park:

See also
ITER

References

External links
Dr. Richard Temkin: High Powered Microwaves & Nuclear Fusion Energy, YouTube, 16 December 2014
Prof. Richard J. Temkin, "High Frequency Gyrotrons and Their Applications", 22 January 2014, Michigan Institute for Plasma Science and Engineering

21st-century American physicists
1945 births
Living people
Harvard University alumni
Massachusetts Institute of Technology people
Fellows of the American Physical Society
Fellow Members of the IEEE
Fellows of the Institute of Physics